, also known as Naganori,  was Japanese samurai of the Sengoku period, in the service of the Imagawa clan. The second son of Okabe Chikatsuna, he became a senior retainer of the Imagawa, following in his father's footsteps. 

In 1560, After his lord Imagawa Yoshimoto was killed at the Battle of Okehazama, he kept fighting and even retrieved his lord's corpse. Following the clan's collapse he switched allegiance to the Takeda clan and defended Takatenjin Castle. 

In 1581, He died in the Siege of Takatenjin when he was attacked by Tokugawa forces.

References

1581 deaths
Samurai
Year of birth unknown